Hora Cero was an Argentine comics magazine which ran between 1957 and 1963. The magazine was established by Héctor Germán Oesterheld and his brother in 1957. The publisher was Editorial Frontera. It was part of the Golden Age of Argentine Comics. The most successful of its published series was El Eternauta. The final issue of Hora Cero appeared in 1963.

References

1957 comics debuts
1963 comics endings
1957 establishments in Argentina
1963 disestablishments in Argentina
Comics magazines published in Argentina
Defunct magazines published in Argentina
Humor magazines
Magazines established in 1957
Magazines disestablished in 1963